Marcinho Guerreiro may refer to:

 Marcinho Guerreiro (footballer, born 1978), Brazilian footballer
 Marcinho Guerreiro (footballer, born 1980), Brazilian footballer